Cheryl Bachelder (born 1956) is an American businesswoman who was Interim CEO of Pier 1 Imports and was previously CEO of AFC Enterprises, the parent company of Popeyes Louisiana Kitchen, from 2007 to 2017. She was president of KFC from 2001 to 2003.

Biography
Bachelder grew up in a Christian family. She received a bachelor of science (1977) and master of business administration (1978) from the Kelley School of Business at Indiana University Bloomington. From 1978 to 1992, Bachelder served in a number of brand management positions in the consumer products industry, at Procter & Gamble, Gillette and RJR Nabisco.

Bachelder put her career on hold several times to be a full-time mother and homemaker. She returned to business in 1995, working as senior vice president of marketing and product development for Domino's Pizza until 2000. In 2001, Bachelder left Domino's to join Yum! Brands as president of the international fried chicken restaurant chain KFC, formerly Kentucky Fried Chicken. Two years later, she was fired, based on what she herself describes as "'mediocre' performance".

In 2006, Bachelder joined the board of directors of AFC Enterprises, the owner of the restaurant chain that was then called Popeyes Chicken & Biscuits. The next year, the board elected her chief executive officer, a post she held until the chain's purchase in March 2017. At the time she was hired, Popeyes had shuffled through four CEOs in the previous seven years, and relationships with franchisees had become strained. Bachelder led Popeyes, which she rebranded as Popeyes Louisiana Kitchen, through ten straight years of growth, with top line restaurant sales rising by 45 percent and restaurant operating profit more than doubled. Popeyes' stock rose in value from $15 to $79 per share, alongside consistent increases in same-store restaurant sales, during her tenure.

Bachelder authored a book, Dare to Serve: How To Drive Superior Results While Serving Others, about servant leadership, the management philosophy she claimed to follow during her years in business. She identifies as a Christian and is pro-life.

References

1956 births
Living people
Kelley School of Business alumni
American women chief executives
American chief executives of food industry companies
20th-century American businesspeople
20th-century American businesswomen
21st-century American businesspeople
21st-century American businesswomen
American Christians